The Blue Ribbon SoundWorks was a software company in the United States. The company produced several digital audio products for the Amiga, including Bars & Pipes, a sequencer described by Sound on Sound as "the ultimate in Amiga sequencing", and SuperJAM!, a music composition tool. Blue Ribbon also produced the One Stop Music Shop, a hardware MIDI interface and synthesizer based on the E-mu Proteus. Other early products included Who! What! When! Where!, a personal information manager. It was founded by Melissa Jordan Grey and Todor Fay, who went on to found NewBlue, a video technology company.

Blue Ribbon was acquired by Microsoft in 1995, and Microsoft subsequently merged Blue Ribbon's technology with DirectSound. After the acquisition, Microsoft made Blue Ribbon's Amiga products available for free download on CompuServe while discontinuing official support.

References

External links
 Official website of NewBlue

1995 mergers and acquisitions
American companies established in 1988
American companies disestablished in 1995
Computer companies established in 1988
Computer companies disestablished in 1995
Defunct computer companies of the United States
Digital audio
Microsoft acquisitions